Uru South is a ward in the Moshi Rural district in the Kilimanjaro Region of Tanzania. In 2016 the Tanzania National Bureau of Statistics report there were 24,565 people in the ward, from 22,904 in 2012.

References

Wards of Kilimanjaro Region